General Patrick may refer to:

Lt. Gen Burton D. Patrick (born 1935), U.S. Army
Gen. Mason Patrick (1863–1942), U.S. Army, who led the air corps during the Interwar
Maj. Gen. Marsena R. Patrick (1811–1888), U.S. Army, who served in the American Civil War
Maj. Gen. Edwin D. Patrick (1894–1945), U.S. Army, commander of the 6th Infantry Division in World War II